The 2016 Cook Islands Census took place on December 1, 2016.
The population of the Cook Islands was counted as 17,434 – a decrease of 360 (2.06%) from the 2011 census.

Results

Population and dwellings
Population counts for the inhabited Islands of the Cook Islands. All figures are for the total population count. The resident population count was 14,802.

 Total population count was 17,434, down 360 from the 2011 Census.
 There are 8,520 males in the Cook Islands (48.87% of the population) and 8,914 females (51.13% of the population).

Ethnicity 

The largest ethnic groups in 2016 were 78.2% Cook Islands Māori, 7.6% part Cook Islands Māori, and 14.2% other ethnic groups.

Data is for the census usually-resident population count.

Religion 

The largest religion in the Cook Islands is the Cook Islands Christian Church with 48.8% of the population identifying with that religion in 2016. Data is for the census usually-resident population count.

References

Census
Cook Islands